Phenacodes nolalis is a moth in the family Crambidae. It is found on Sulawesi.

The wingspan is about 20 mm. The forewings are white, the basal half irrorated with black. There is a black dot below the base of the costa, as well as a black antemedial line. The hindwings are semi-hyaline, slightly suffused with fuscous in the terminal area.

References

Cybalomiinae
Moths described in 1899